The Australasian Performing Right Association Awards of 2000 (generally known as APRA Awards) are a series of awards held in May 2000. The APRA Music Awards  were presented by APRA and the Australasian Mechanical Copyright Owners Society (AMCOS). Only one classical music award was available in 2000: Most Performed Contemporary Classical Composition. APRA provided awards for "Best Television Theme", and "Best Film Score" in 2000. APRA and AMCOS also sponsored the Australian Guild of Screen Composers (AGSC), which provided their own awards ceremony, from 1996 to 2000, with categories for film and TV composers.

Awards 
Nominees and winners with results indicated on the right.

See also 
 Music of Australia

References

External links 
 APRA official website
 APRA Awards - History

2000 in Australian music
2000 music awards
APRA Awards